Boninena is a genus of air-breathing land snails, terrestrial pulmonate gastropod mollusks in the family Enidae.

Species
Species within the genus Boninena include:

 Boninena callistoderma
 Boninena hiraseana
 Boninena ogasawarae

References

 ZipcodeZoo info at: 

Enidae
Taxonomy articles created by Polbot